Michel Sprunger (born 30 April 1985) is a Swiss footballer who plays as a midfielder for SC Dornach.

References

External links
 
 

1985 births
Living people
Swiss men's footballers
FC Winterthur players
Association football midfielders